was a Japanese baseball player for the Yomiuri Giants. He previously played for the Hiroshima Toyo Carp before being traded to the Giants in 2006. He played for the Giants through the 2009 season before retiring as a player, returning to the Giants for 2010 in a coaching capacity.

Kimura was born in Miyazaki, Miyazaki, Japan. He joined the Nippon-Ham Fighters from outside the amateur draft in 1990 after graduating from high school, and went on to become the leading utility player in Japanese baseball. His solid hitting, speed, and strong arm made him a valuable offensive and defensive player. He played games at every single position except pitcher, catching four games in the 1999 season. He played first base for one game in 1998. He was registered as an outfielder, but played more games in the infield in recent years. In 2004, he was recruited for the Athens Olympics for his skills as a utility player.

He had the same name as Takuya Kimura of the popular Japanese pop group, SMAP. He once made an appearance on the television show SMAP×SMAP, hosted by his namesake.

On April 2, 2010, at Hiroshima's Mazda Stadium preceding a game against the Hiroshima Toyo Carp, Kimura was hitting practice knocks to infielders when he suddenly collapsed and was rushed to hospital in a coma. He was diagnosed with subarachnoid hemorrhage and died in Hiroshima, Japan, on April 7, 2010. He died just eight days before his 38th birthday.

References

1972 births
2010 deaths
Baseball players at the 2004 Summer Olympics
Hiroshima Toyo Carp players
Nippon Ham Fighters players
Olympic baseball players of Japan
Olympic bronze medalists for Japan
Baseball people from Miyazaki Prefecture
Yomiuri Giants players
Olympic medalists in baseball
Japanese baseball coaches
Nippon Professional Baseball coaches
Medalists at the 2004 Summer Olympics